John Bray (August 19, 1875 in Middleport, New York – July 18, 1945 in San Francisco, California) was an American athlete.

He won the bronze medal over 1500 m at the Olympic Games in Paris in 1900. Bray also participated in the 800 metre competition and finished sixth.

References

External links

1875 births
1945 deaths
American male middle-distance runners
Athletes (track and field) at the 1900 Summer Olympics
Olympic bronze medalists for the United States in track and field
Williams College alumni
Medalists at the 1900 Summer Olympics
People from Niagara County, New York
Sportspeople from New York (state)